Aplochiton is a genus of osmeriform fish of the family Galaxiidae native to Argentina, Chile and the Falklands Islands.

Species
FishBase lists two recognized species in this genus:

 Aplochiton marinus Eigenmann, 1928
 Aplochiton taeniatus Jenyns, 1842
 Aplochiton zebra Jenyns, 1842

References

 
Fish of South America
Taxa named by Leonard Jenyns
Ray-finned fish genera